Tales is an American anthology television series created by Irv Gotti. The series premiered on BET on June 27, 2017. It was renewed for a second season, which premiered on July 2, 2019. In March 2021, BET renewed the series for a third season, which premiered on August 9, 2022.

Plot
Each episode tells a new "tale" inspired by past and current songs that are turned into stories.

Cast

Tristan Wilds as Kayron (episode: "Deep Cover", season 2)
Justine Skye as Violet (episode: "Bodak Yellow", season 2)
Boris Kodjoe as prosecutor Ray Vance (episode: "F**k the Police", season 1)
Ben Vereen as Harry (season 2)
Jennifer Freeman as Ashley (episode: "I Got a Story to Tell", season 1)
Lance Gross as Reggie (episode: "Trap Queen", season 1)
Rhyon Nicole Brown as Germaine (episode: "99 Problems", season 1)
Debbi Morgan as Clarice (season 2)
DeRay Davis as Davenport (episode: "Slippery", season 2)
Roger Guenveur Smith as Tobias McCall (episode: "Fight the Power", season 3)
Woody McClain as Slim (episode: "I Got a Story to Tell", season 1)
Matthew Noszka as Brody Wilson (episode: "F**k the Police", season 1)
Romeo Miller as Rider (episode: "Bodak Yellow", season 2)
Bre-Z as Ty (episode: "Children Story", season 1)
Hassan Johnson as Dougie (episode: "Deep Cover", season 2)
Grace Byers as Edie (season 2)
Elise Neal as Detective Beatriz (episode: "I Got a Story to Tell", season 1)
Laila Odom as Renee (episode: "Renee", season 3)
Jim Jones as Taggert (episode: "All I Need", season 1)
Walnette Marie Santiago as Angelica (season 2)
Demetrius Shipp, Jr. as Kenny (episode: "All I Need", season 1)
Dawn Halfkenny as Officer Cooper (episode: "Slippery", season 2)
Draya Michele as Viveca (episode: "Brothers", season 2)
Rick Ross as Zeke (episode: "My Life", season 2)
Peyton Alex Smith as Miles (episode: "99 Problems", season 1)
MC Lyte as Detective Makena Daniels (episode: "Cold Hearted", season 1)
Bella Thorne (season 2)
Keith Powers as Amari "Gutta" Anderson (episode: "Cold Hearted", season 1)
Lex Scott Davis as Angie (episode: "You Got Me", season 1)
Sinqua Walls as Marcus (episode: "All I Need", season 1)
Michelle Mitchenor as Crystal (season 1)
Sean Nelson as prosecutor Stokely Overton (episode: "Fight the Power", season 3)
Elijah Kelley as Paul (episode: "Brothers", season 2)
Christian Robinson as Lil Tank (episode: "Cold Hearted", season 1)
Charles Malik Whitfield as Blue (episode: "99 Problems", season 1)
Steve Harris as Officer McBride (episode: "Slippery", season 2)
Morocco Omari as Chris (season 2)
Shayla Love as Trina (season 1)
Thomas Q. Jones as Jimmy (episode: "Brothers", season 2)
Bri Collins as Camille King (episode: "Act Up", season 3)
Nafessa Williams as Jenny Davis (season 1)
Clifton Powell as Bob Davis (episode: "F**k the Police", season 1)
J. Alphonse Nicholson as Ricky (season 1—3)
Tami Roman as Silk (episode: "All I Need", season 1)
Jharrel Jerome as Deacon (episode: "Children's Story", season 1)
Boogiie Byrd as Frank (episode: "Slippery", season 2)

Episodes

Season 1 (2017)

Season 2 (2019)

Season 3 (2022)

References

External links

2010s American anthology television series
2010s American drama television series
2017 American television series debuts
2020s American anthology television series
2020s American drama television series
BET original programming
English-language television shows